The Y class was a class of 18 diesel locomotives built by British Thomson-Houston and Clayton Equipment Company for the Western Australian Government Railways between 1953 and 1955. British Thomson-Houston supplied the electrical control equipment but the mechanical work, assembly and testing was carried out by Clayton Equipment Company at their premises in Hatton, Derbyshire. The locomotives carried separate builders plates for each company.

They were used as shunters, primarily in Perth and Fremantle although some did haul freight services in the Geraldton and Pinjarra areas. They were withdrawn by 1990 with seven being preserved.

References

Bo-Bo locomotives
BTH locomotives
Y class
Railway locomotives introduced in 1953
3 ft 6 in gauge locomotives of Australia
Diesel-electric locomotives of Australia